Electric relates to electricity.

Electric may also refer to:

Literature
"I Sing the Body Electric" (poem), a poem by Walt Whitman (and many later works derived from it)

Music
Electric guitar, a type of guitar
Electronic Drum, a type of drum

Albums
Electric (The Cult album)
Electric (Jack Ingram album)
Electric (Paul Rodgers album)
Electric (Pet Shop Boys album)
Electric (Richard Thompson album) 
Electrik, an album by Maksim Mrvica

Songs
"Electric" (Girlband song)
"Electric" (Katy Perry song)
"Electric" (Leila K song)
"Electric" (Lisa Scott-Lee song)
"Electric" (Melody Club song), also covered by Slava and by Cameron Cartio
"Electric" (Omarion song)
"Electric" (Robyn song)

Other uses
Electric (music producers), Norwegian songwriting and production duo
Electric (software), an electronic design automation software tool
Electric locomotive, a locomotive whose power comes from electricity

See also
Electricity (disambiguation)
Electric City (disambiguation)